Newton K. (Uyesugi) Wesley (c. 1909 – July 21, 2011) was an optometrist and an early pioneer of the contact lens. Wesley was a partner with George Jessen in the development and advancement of contact lens. Together they founded the Wesley-Jessen Corporation as well as the National Eye Research Foundation. Wesley-Jessen was acquired by Schering Plough in 1980 then and CIBA Vision by 2001.

Career
Working in an Uptown basement, Wesley helped craft a solution to his deteriorating vision: Comfortable contact lenses that could be worn for long periods. Considered a pioneer in the contact lens industry, the Chicago-based Dr. Wesley went on to become one of the leading developers and manufacturers of contact lenses, paving the way for the modern contacts we know today.

Born Newton Uyesugi to Japanese-immigrant parents in Westport, Oregon, Wesley thrived in school and managed to graduate from high school at 16. He then enrolled at the North Pacific College of Optometry in Portland, Oregon, in 1925. By the age of 22, he had an optometry practice in Portland. He had also begun to operate his alma mater, what is known now as Pacific University College of Optometry. Then during World War II he was forced to relocate to Richmond, Indiana, due to Executive Order 9066. Where he attended Earlham College for two years.

Wesley was the president of Oregon's Japanese-American Citizens League at one point. Governor Charles Sprague advocated for him to be allowed into medical school despite anti-Japanese sentiment at the time.

In the Uptown neighborhood of Chicago Dr. Wesley began researching a solution to his vision problems. The optometrist suffered from keratoconus, a degenerative disease of the cornea that affects vision, and had been told by experts that he'd likely lose his sight. He knew that contact lenses helped him see, but the lenses available in the 1940s couldn't be worn for long periods. So Dr. Wesley and his partner, George Jessen, began to research and develop a new type.

Wesley and Jessen eventually developed the plastic lenses known as rigid contact lenses. The lens fit over just the cornea, unlike its predecessor, which also rested on the sclera (the white area), said Neil Hodur, a professor at the Illinois College of Optometry and a colleague and friend of Dr. Wesley's. The end product was lenses that were smaller, thinner and longer-wearing, said Alfred Rosenbloom, a former dean and president of the Illinois College of Optometry.

In 1946, Dr. Wesley and Jessen formed the Plastic Contact Lens Co., which later became Wesley-Jessen Inc. It was acquired by 2001 by Ciba Vision. Dr. Wesley's company began to manufacture and distribute the new, more comfortable lens, though it took an aggressive marketing campaign to convince the 1950s public that placing the lens in the eye was safe, Hodur said. He also founded the now defunct National Eye Research Foundation.

Dr. Wesley, known for his bushy sideburns, toured the country marketing and promoting the lenses to eye care professionals, celebrities like Phyllis Diller and television audiences — who were wowed by his model, Leo, the contact-wearing rabbit. The optometrist traveled so often that he learned to pilot a plane that took off from Meigs Field. Dr. Wesley's family also says that in the 1950s, he campaigned to get "contact lens" into the dictionary.

Personal life
In 1942, a year after he married the late Cecilia Sasaki Wesley, the optometrist and his family — including two young children — were sent to the Minidoka War Relocation Center in Idaho. Dr. Wesley, who for business purposes Anglicized his name to what he thought sounded similar to his Japanese last name, was able to receive permission to leave the camp — though his family stayed. The optometrist moved to the Midwest and attended Earlham College in Indiana, then settled in Chicago. When his family was released from the camp at the end of the war, they joined him in Uptown.

Dr. Wesley, 93, died of congestive heart failure on July 21, 2011 at the Stephenson Nursing Center in Freeport, Ill. Dr. Wesley is survived by his wife, Sandra; three daughters, Shona, Justine and Jenna Williams; four sons, Roy, Morgan, Taylor and Newton Lee; five grandchildren; and three great-grand children.

References

American optometrists
1900s births
2011 deaths
American people of Japanese descent
Japanese-American internees
Earlham College alumni
People from Clatsop County, Oregon
Pacific University alumni
Scientists from Portland, Oregon